Frederick W. Hodgson (1886 -1930), known as Fred W. Hodgson, was an American architect based in Logan, Utah.

He was born March 19, 1886, in Salt Lake City, Utah

He died February 16, 1930.

Relationship to Leslie S. Hodgson (1879-1947) / Hodgson & McClenahan ?

He worked as a draftsman for Smith & Hodgson in Ogden during 1908–1909.

At least one of his works is listed on the National Register of Historic Places.

Works include:
Ray B. West Building (1918), Utah State University campus, Logan, Utah
Smithfield Public Library (1921), Smithfield, Utah, NRHP-listed
First Presbyterian Church (1924), Logan

The collected architectural drawings of Fred W. Hodgson are held by the Utah State University's Merrill-Cazier Library in Logan, Utah.  These are mostly of works in Cache County and Box Elder County.

References

Architects from Salt Lake City
Architects from Utah
1886 births
1930 deaths
20th-century American architects